Raymond Tarcy (18 November 1936, French Guiana – 3 July 2019) was a politician from French Guiana who was elected to the French Senate in 1980. He previously had served as mayor of his hometown of Saint-Laurent-du-Maroni for twelve years. The Lycée Raymond Tarcy in Saint-Laurent-du-Maroni has been named after Tarcy.

References 

French Guianan politicians
French Senators of the Fifth Republic
1936 births
2019 deaths
Senators of French Guiana
20th-century French politicians
People from Saint-Laurent-du-Maroni